The 6th Mieczysław Połukard Criterium of Polish Speedway League Aces was the 1987 version of the Mieczysław Połukard Criterium of Polish Speedway Leagues Aces. It took place on March 29 in the Polonia Stadium in Bydgoszcz, Poland.

Final standings

Sources 
 Roman Lach - Polish Speedway Almanac

See also 

Mieczyslaw Polukard
Mieczyslaw Polukard
Mieczysław Połukard Criterium of Polish Speedway Leagues Aces